Boeun County (Boeun-gun) is a county in North Chungcheong Province, South Korea.

History
Boeun ( literally "offering gratitude" or "thanksgiving"), was a South Korean town named in 1406 by a remorseful King Taejong, who felt relieved that he had cleared his conscience after having participated in a ceremonial ritual at the local Beopjusa temple to appease the spirits of his dead younger half-brothers, whose deaths he had caused in a power struggle years earlier.

In July 1973, Boeun township was elevated to the status of Boeun town. 
In 1983, two townships were abolished and incorporated into normal ones. In 2007, Hoebuk-myeon changed its name to Hoein-myeon, Oesongni-myeon to Jangan-myeon, and Naesonngni-myeon into Songnisan-myeonn.

Festivals
 Songnisan Fall Festival: During autumn a festival is held at Songnisan, a celebrated mountain in central Korea. The festival has been an important contributor to the development of tourism and the economy in the region.
 Boeun Ocher Apple Festival: Boeun County is well known for its apples, for which a major festival is held to promote them.

Products
Jujube is the most well-known agricultural product in Boeun county. Additionally, the county's fruit, and eggs are growing in popularity thanks to their eco-friendly mark.

Climate
Boeun has a monsoon-influenced humid continental climate (Köppen: Dwa) with cold, dry winters and hot, rainy summers.

Symbols
 City Flower: Forsythia
 City Tree: Jujube tree
 City Bird: Magpie Birds

Twin towns – sister cities
Boeun is twinned with:

  Gwangjin-gu, Seoul
  Clarence-Rockland, Canada

References

External links

Boeun County government home page

 
Counties of North Chungcheong Province